"Let You Know" is a song by Australian electronic musician Flume, co-written by and featuring singer Hannah Reid of the English indie pop band London Grammar. It was released as a single on 12 June 2019, by Australian music label Future Classic. The track was first premiered on Annie Mac's BBC Radio 1 show.

Background
Flume wrote "Let You Know" with Hannah Reid of English indie pop band London Grammar in the summer of 2018 on a writing trip in London during which he also met Slowthai, who he collaborated with on the track "High Beams". In a statement, Flume explained that the track "just came together really naturally in the studio that day." Reid further revealed that the pair had wanted to collaborate "for years" but had been unable to due to their busy schedules, and added that working with the producer was "an honour because he pushes the boundaries of electronic music like nobody else."

Critical reception
"Let You Know" was met with critical acclaim. Bella Bagshaw of Dancing Astronaut called the song "otherworldly" and highlighted Reid's voice's "swift, almost spectral presence, bolstering the otherworldly, journey-oriented through line of Flume's resounding revamp," while Sydney Gore of Highsnobiety described the single as a "cosmic collaboration" and "emotionally explosive." Steph Evans, writing for Earmilk, approved of Flume's choice of collaborator and hailed the track as "signature Flume at his best." The Music Networks Zanda Wilson commended the electronic artist's "uncanny ability to complement the musicality and timbre of his guest vocalist, while also staying true to his distinctive style." Lake Schatz of Consequence of Sound described the collaboration as "at times both bubbly and heartbreaking."

Promotion
On 7 June 2019, Flume announced through his social media that new music would be released on 12 June 2019. This announcement also previewed the visual for the music, created by Australian graphic designer and long time Flume collaborator Jonathan Zawada.

On 11 June 2019, the track was announced alongside Flume's late 2019 European tour schedule.

Track listings
 Digital download
 "Let You Know" – 3:19

 Ross from Friends remix
 "Let You Know"  – 4:22

 Nathan C remix
 "Let You Know"  – 3:15

Personnel
Credits adapted from Tidal.
 Flume – songwriting, production
 Hannah Reid – songwriting

Charts

Certifications

References

2019 singles
2019 songs
Flume (musician) songs
London Grammar songs
Song recordings produced by Flume (musician)
Songs written by Flume (musician)
Songs written by Hannah Reid